Owen Leopoldo Meighan (born 7 February 1944) is a Belizean athlete. He competed in the men's long jump at the 1968 Summer Olympics.

References

External links
 

1944 births
Living people
Athletes (track and field) at the 1968 Summer Olympics
Belizean male long jumpers
Olympic athletes of Belize
Place of birth missing (living people)